Minuscule 221 (in the Gregory-Aland numbering), α69 (Soden), is a Greek minuscule manuscript of the New Testament, on parchment. Paleographically it has been assigned to the 10th century. Scrivener labelled it by 212a and 250p.
It has marginalia.

Description 

The codex contains a complete text of the Acts of the Apostles, Catholic epistles, and Pauline epistles on 382 parchment leaves (size ). The text is written in one column per page, 18-19 lines per page.

It also contains one leaf from Cyril's Homilies, and two others later.

According to Scrivener it is a beautiful copy.

Text 

The Greek text of the codex is a representative of the Byzantine text-type. Aland placed it in Category V.

It contains the Comma Johanneum, but it was added by a later hand.

History 

The manuscript was brought by Busbeck from Constantinople (along with Minuscule 222).

The manuscript was examined by Coxe, Scrivener, and C. R. Gregory (1887).

It is currently housed at the Bodleian Library (Canon. Gr. 110), at Oxford.

See also 

 List of New Testament minuscules
 Biblical manuscript
 Textual criticism

References

Further reading 

 

Greek New Testament minuscules
10th-century biblical manuscripts
Bodleian Library collection